Dundee is a surname. Notable people with the surname include:

Angelo Dundee (1921–2012), American boxing trainer
Bill Dundee (born 1943), ring name of Scottish–Australian professional wrestler William Cruickshanks
Jamie Dundee (born 1971), a ring name of James Cruickshanks, Australia-born American professional wrestler and son of Bill Dundee best known as J. C. Ice
Joe Dundee (1903–1982), Italian American boxer
John Dundee (born 1921), Northern Irish medical anesthesiologist
Johnny Dundee (1893–1965), Italian American boxer
Sean Dundee (born 1972), South African/German footballer
Vince Dundee (1907–1949), Italian American boxer

Fictional 
Michael "Crocodile" Dundee (also called Mick), played by Paul Hogan, is an Australian fictional character, the protagonist in the Crocodile Dundee film series.